Smith O. Streeter (July 14, 1844 – December 17, 1930) was an American roque player who competed in the 1904 Summer Olympics. He was born in Ontario, Canada. In 1904 he won the silver medal in the Olympic roque tournament.

References

External links
Smith Streeter's profile at Sports Reference.com

1844 births
1930 deaths
American roque players
Olympic roque players of the United States
Roque players at the 1904 Summer Olympics
Olympic silver medalists for the United States
Medalists at the 1904 Summer Olympics